Clean, Old-Fashioned Hate is an American college football rivalry between the Georgia Bulldogs and the Georgia Tech Yellow Jackets. They have been heated rivals since 1893.

The sports rivalry between the two institutions has traditionally focused on football, a sport in which both programs have historically been successful, with an annual game often held on Thanksgiving weekend. However, they compete in a variety of other intercollegiate sports, as well as competing for government and private funding, potential students, and academic recognition regionally and nationally.

The University of Georgia (commonly referred to as UGA, or Georgia) is located in the college town of Athens, and is a liberal arts research university. The Georgia Institute of Technology (commonly referred to as Georgia Tech, Tech, or GT) is a science, technology, engineering, and mathematics research university with a metropolitan campus in Midtown Atlanta. Georgia competes athletically in the Southeastern Conference while Georgia Tech competes in the Atlantic Coast Conference since 1979 after leaving the SEC in 1964.

The two teams have won seven national titles in football. Georgia Tech claims four national championships: 1917, 1928, 1952, and 1990. Georgia also claims four titles: 1942, 1980, 2021, and 2022. Georgia also has won a title in baseball in 1990. Both schools have also seen prominence in men's basketball, with Georgia Tech reaching the Final Fours of 1990 and 2004 (when it reached the National Championship game). Georgia made the Final Four in its first NCAA Tournament appearance in 1983.

Series history

Establishment
Georgia was the first state-chartered school in the U.S., founded on January 27, 1785. Georgia Tech was founded 100 years later on October 13, 1885. Patrick Hues Mell, the president of the University of Georgia at that time, was a firm believer that the new school should be located in Athens with UGA's main campus, like the Agricultural and Mechanical School. Despite Mell's arguments, the new school was located near what was then the northern city limits of Atlanta.

The first known hostilities between the two schools trace back to 1891. The University of Georgia's literary magazine declared the school's colors to be "old gold, black, and crimson." Dr. Charles H. Herty, the first UGA football coach, felt that old gold was too similar to yellow and that yellow "symbolized cowardice." Also in 1891, a student vote chose old gold and white as Georgia Tech's school colors. After the 1893 football game against Tech, Herty removed old gold as an official school color. Tech first used old gold for their uniforms, as a proverbial slap in the face to UGA, in their first unofficial football game against Auburn in 1891. Georgia Tech's school colors were henceforth old gold and white.

Wartime disruption

Fuel was added to the fire in 1919, when UGA mocked Tech's continuation of football during the United States' involvement in World War I. At the time, Tech was a military training ground and had a complete assembly of male students. Many schools, such as UGA, had lost the vast majority of their able-bodied male students to the war effort, forcing them to temporarily suspend football during the war. As a result, UGA did not play a football game from 1917–18. When UGA renewed its program in 1919, the student body staged a parade, which mocked Tech's continuation of football during times of war. The parade featured a tank shaped float emblazoned with the words "UGA IN ARGONNE" followed by a yellow-clad donkey and a sign that read "TECH IN ATLANTA." This act led directly to Tech cutting athletic ties with UGA and canceling several of UGA's home football games at Grant Field (UGA commonly used Grant Field as its home field). Tech and UGA did not compete in athletics until the 1921 Southern Conference basketball tournament. Regular season competition was not renewed until a 1925 agreement between the two institutions.

Series information

Until Vince Dooley became Georgia's head coach in 1964, the rivalry was fairly evenly matched, with Tech holding a slim 27–26–5 series lead. This is mostly due to the success of Georgia Tech's hall-of-fame head coach, Bobby Dodd who had a 12–10 record against the Bulldogs. During his reign, the Yellow Jackets won eight in a row against UGA from 1949–1956. This is the longest winning streak by either team in the rivalry's history. During these eight years, Tech dominated UGA, and outscored the Bulldogs 176–39. However, when Dooley took over at UGA in 1964, the rivalry flipped. Dooley went 19–6 against Georgia Tech, including a 3–0 head-to-head record against Dodd. Since 1969, UGA has dominated the rivalry, posting a 38–14 record. During this time the Bulldogs have had win streaks of six games (1978–1983), seven games (1991–1997), seven games (2001–2007), and five games (2009–2013). Former Georgia coach Mark Richt finished with a record of 13–2 against Tech, while now-retired GT head coach Paul Johnson finished at 3–8 against UGA. 2014 was the first year that overtime occurred at Sanford Stadium. GT went on to win 30–24. In 2018, Georgia beat Tech in Athens 45-21. Georgia Tech is in the midst of a twenty-year home drought against the Dawgs, having failed to beat Georgia in Atlanta since 1999. The Yellow Jackets lost to their in-state rivals 52–7 and 45–0 at Grant Field in 2019 and 2021, respectively, the largest-ever margins of victory for the Bulldogs. However, Georgia Tech holds the largest margin with a 48–0 win from 1943*.

* Georgia Disputes Games in 1943 and 1944

Fight songs
The fight songs, sung at every sporting event, have even been tailored to the rivalry. The "Ramblin' Wreck from Georgia Tech" was first published in the Georgia Tech yearbook, The Blueprint, and was written following the first Georgia football game in which Georgia fans harassed the Georgia Tech players and fans. Hence the infamous chorus "To Hell with Georgia" was written. "Up With the White and Gold", published in 1929, featured the lyrics "Down with the red and black" and even "Drop the battle axe on Georgia's head." Georgia's unofficial fight song, "Glory, Glory" was arranged in 1909 and remains unchanged to this day. Officially, the end of the fight song is "G-E-O-R-G-I-A", but Georgia students change the lyrics to "To hell with Georgia Tech!" during the Georgia-Georgia Tech game. In more recent years, students have replaced Georgia Tech in the song with the name of whatever school they are playing at the time. The official fight song of The University of Georgia is "Hail to Georgia", although many observers erroneously infer that the official fight song is "Glory, Glory" because it is played more often, much as the University of Tennessee at Knoxville has as its official fight song "Here's To Old Tennessee" (using the tune of Yale University's "Down the Field") but plays "Rocky Top" more often.

Game results

* The University of Georgia's athletic association lists the Bulldogs' 1943 and 1944 losses, but does not include them in the series win–loss record. In 1949, Dan Magill, UGA's publicity director, put asterisks by the two games due to Georgia Tech assisting in the war effort by housing a Naval training center during World War II which he claimed gave an unfair advantage those two years; Georgia Tech's athletic association includes the Yellow Jackets' 1943 and 1944 wins in the series record.

Traditions

It is common for Georgia fans to refer to the Georgia Institute of Technology as Georgia Tech University, GTU, or North Avenue Trade School. The "GTU" nickname is derived from the common mistitle given to Georgia Tech in media outlets. Also, since Georgia Tech is an engineering school, Georgia fans often refer to Tech fans as nerds, dorks, Techies, or Gnats (acronym for Georgia North Avenue Trade School). The school's campus and Grant Field front North Avenue in midtown Atlanta, giving rise to the "Trade School" nickname. Grant Field is also very commonly referred to as "The Joke by Coke" by Georgia fans, based on its proximity to the headquarters of The Coca-Cola Company. Georgia fans also refer to the 600 level of Sanford Stadium as the "Tech Deck", due to the placement of Georgia Tech fans up in that section of the stadium. Georgia Tech fans combat this by calling UGA, "The University (sic) of Georgia". They also often refer to UGA fans as rednecks, and even sometimes refuse to capitalize the letter "U" in the acronym.

A common rallying cry for students of Georgia Tech is the question "What's the good word?" often repeated three times (the answer being "To Hell with Georgia!") and, on the fourth time, will then ask "How 'bout them Dawgs?" ("Piss on 'em!") Tech students have also created an unofficial fight song entitled '"To Hell With Georgia", which is set to tune of The Battle Hymn of the Republic and refers to UGA as "the cesspool of the South."

Another long-standing tradition at Georgia Tech, which began in 1915, requires freshmen to wear a RAT cap, which stands for "Recruit at Tech", around campus, and most notably to football games. The caps are decorated with the football team's scores, the freshman's name, hometown, major, and expected graduation date, and "To HELL With georgia" emblazoned on the back of the cap. Tradition states that freshmen are required to wear the RAT cap at least until the homecoming game, where they can take it off after the game for a Georgia Tech win, or keep it on the remainder of the freshman year if they lose. Anti-hazing laws have loosened the strictness and overall participation by most freshmen at Georgia Tech, except in the volunteer marching band.

The school newspapers of the two institutions often mock their rival institution. The Red and Black, Georgia's daily newspaper, usually has a few jokes and articles mocking Georgia Tech the week before the football game.The Technique, Georgia Tech's weekly newspaper, prints a larger, special edition mocking The Red and Black, and commonly refers to its rival as "The University (sic) of Georgia." The special edition features several articles of parody and humor based on fictitious happenings at the University of Georgia, and is known as "To Hell With Georgia", after the school's popular cheer. On years where the schools play their match at UGA's Sanford Stadium, Technique staff distribute the issue across UGA's campus.

UGA students traditionally ring the school's Chapel Bell until midnight following any home football win. However, when UGA beats Tech, the bell rings all night long. Tech has a similar tradition with its whistle. UGA's Chapel Bell and Georgia Tech's Ramblin' Wreck have been rumored to have been stolen numerous times by their respective rival before, after, or even during major sporting events between the two schools. The bulldog statue in front of UGA's Memorial Hall was once stolen by Tech students. The culprits put the UGA and Tech police on a scavenger hunt to find the missing statue. Many fans of the respective institutions refuse to even partake in clothing, food, or other materials of their rival's school colors. Examples include Georgia fans refusing to eat mustard or Georgia Tech fans refusing to use red pens.

Two Georgia Tech fight songs refer to UGA in their lyrics: "Up With the White and Gold" has the lyric "down with the Red & Black", and "Ramblin' Wreck from Georgia Tech" contains the lyric "To Hell with Georgia". No UGA fight song officially refers to Georgia Tech in any way, though at the conclusion of "Glory, Glory" students often change the final line from G-E-O-R-G-I-A to "and to Hell with Georgia Tech" as they do with all of their opponents.

Sports

Football

The game has been played 116 times according to Georgia Tech and only 114 times according to Georgia record books. Georgia discredits two games in 1943 and 1944 (both years in which Georgia Tech won) because many of their players went to fight in World War II, though official college football records include the games. The game has been played in either Athens or Atlanta alternating every year since 1928. Both Georgia Tech and Georgia hold 4 national titles for a total of 8 national titles between them. The two schools also have a total of 31 conference titles (15 for Tech, 16 for Georgia) between them, making the rivalry a battle between two historically prestigious programs.

The record between the two teams is 70 Georgia wins, 41 Georgia Tech wins, and 5 ties. Georgia Tech's longest winning streak, and the longest in the series, was eight games from 1949–1956. Georgia's longest winning streak in the series was seven straight games from 1991 to 1997 and again from 2001 to 2007. Georgia won the most recent game in the series on November 26 at Sanford Stadium, in Athens, by a final score of 37-14. The victor wins the Governor's Cup.

The first time the two teams met on the football field was on November 4, 1893. The Georgia School of Technology (Georgia Tech's original name) Blacksmiths led by coaches Stanley E. "Stan" Borleske and Casey C. Finnegan traveled  by train to play the Georgia team coached by Ernest Brown in Athens at Herty Field. The Blacksmiths defeated Georgia handily 28–6 on four scores by Leonard Wood, a thirty-three-year-old United States Army physician and future Medal of Honor recipient. During and after the game, disgruntled Georgia fans threw rocks and other debris at the Georgia Tech players and chased the victorious Blacksmiths back to their awaiting train.

The next day in the Atlanta Journal, an Athens journalist accused Tech of using "a heterogeneous collection of Atlanta residents – a United States Army surgeon, a medical student, a lawyer, and an insurance agent among them, with here and there a student of Georgia's School of Technology thrown in to give the mixture a Technological flavor." Hence, the sports rivalry was born.

1902 saw the series' first scoreless tie. Georgia came in as 6–1 favorites. "It's the worst game we have ever played." said Georgia captain Frank M. Ridley. On Tech was its first All-Southern player, Jesse Thrash.

In 1905, Tech beat Georgia 46–0. Craig Day returned a missed field goal 110 yards for a touchdown.

In 1908, UGA attacked Tech's recruitment tactics in football. UGA alumni incited a Southern Intercollegiate Athletic Association investigation into Tech's recruitment of a player UGA had recruited as well. The Georgia Alumni claimed that Tech had created a fraudulent scholarship fund, which they used to persuade the player to attend Tech rather than UGA. The SIAA ruled in favor of Tech, but the 1908 game was cancelled that season due to bad blood between the rivals.

The 1915 game was the second scoreless tie. John G. Henderson headed a group of three men, one behind the other with his hands upon the shoulders of the one in front, to counter John Heisman's jump shift offense.

The only true break in the series dates back to 1917 and the United States entry into World War I. The two institutions felt that the rivalry had grown too intense, fueled by Georgia's inflammatory accusations that Georgia Tech was cowardly because the school continued its football program during wartime while Georgia suspended its program for the football seasons of 1917 and 1918. Tech meanwhile won the South's first recognized national championship in 1917.

The game renewed play again in 1925. That year, Tech quarterback Ike Williams thought the game clock read five seconds remaining in the third quarter when in actuality it was five minutes. Williams set up his offense for a field goal and kicked it to put Tech up 3–0 on first down. Luckily for Williams, Tech won 3–0. Georgia end Smack Thompson would yell out in his sleep, and had said "Kill the SOB" in reference to Tech's star fullback Doug Wycoff leading up to the game. Once during the game, the two collided with each other, knocking each unconscious.

In 1927, Georgia's "dream and wonder" team marched onto Grant Field having won all its games and upset Yale. The Bulldogs were ensured a national championship with a victory. Georgia Tech won 12 to 0. The field was a muddy mess from the rain, and some Georgia supporters contended that Tech watered down the field.

In 1932, Georgia Tech and Georgia were two of the original 13 charter members of the Southeastern Conference. Georgia Tech would continue its membership until 1964 after Tech Coach Bobby Dodd began a historic feud with Alabama Coach Bear Bryant. Georgia Tech left the SEC concerning the allocation of scholarships and student athlete treatment. Georgia Tech would later attempt re-entry but the re-entry was eventually voted down. Lacking a league in which to compete, Georgia Tech helped charter the Metro Conference in 1975 for all sports besides football (in which it remained independent for nearly 20 years). Tech eventually joined the Atlantic Coast Conference in 1979, though it would not compete for the ACC football championship until 1983. Since 1979, Georgia has won 33 of the last 43 games against Georgia Tech. Georgia coaches Mark Richt and Kirby Smart have had a large part in the Bulldog's recent dominance over Georgia Tech, enjoying a 13–2 record and 5-1 record respectively, against the Yellow Jackets.

In 2020, the rivalry was not played for the first time since 1925 due to the COVID-19 pandemic, which resulted in the SEC limiting its schedule to conference-only play.

Basketball
The Georgia Tech and Georgia basketball rivalry can be just as heated as its football counterpart. The two teams have played 197 times with Georgia Tech leading the series with 106 wins over Georgia's 91 wins. The first game between the two basketball teams was on March 10, 1906. Georgia Tech won the game 27–13 in Athens. The longest winning streak by UGA was 7 games, which occurred twice from 1909–1921 and from 1980–1984. Georgia Tech accumulated a 10-game winning streak, its longest over UGA, from 1958–1961. Like most series, there is a distinct advantage to being the home team. The home record since 1906 is 111–53 (67.7%) while 23 games in the series have been played on neutral courts.

The Georgia Tech vs. Georgia game was played in the Omni Coliseum for 14 years beginning in 1981 and ending in 1994. The series in the Omni favored the Yellow Jackets with an 8–6 record. The neutrality of the Omni, because of its proximity to Georgia Tech, came into question by the UGA athletic department in 1993 so the series was renewed as an alternating home court event. The home team has won every game but four since the home court advantage was reinstated, Georgia won two road games (2000, 2010); Georgia Tech won two (2011, 2013). Since 1994, the Tech-UGA basketball game has had the highest average attendance for both teams at their respective stadiums.

9 other games were played on neutral courts. These games occurred in the SIC Tournament (1921 and 1923), SEC tournament (1934, 1945, 1946, and 1948), and the Gator Bowl Tournament (1952, 1953, and 1960). Tech holds a 5–4 record in these tournaments over Georgia.

On an ironic note, after tornadoes forced the 2008 SEC men's basketball tournament to be moved from the Georgia Dome to Georgia Tech's home court Alexander Memorial Coliseum (now known as Hank McCamish Pavilion), the Bulldogs pulled off an unlikely stretch of three wins in thirty hours to win the tournament on their bitter rivals' home court.

The basketball rivalry has picked up intensity recently after Georgia Tech coach Josh Pastner's first tweet after being hired was #THWg (To Hell With Georgia). Pastner's Yellow Jackets however could not live up to the smack talk as the Bulldogs won convincingly 60–43 on the Yellow Jackets home court. Pastner’s second attempt to beat Georgia also fell short, as the Yellow Jackets were pummeled at Stegeman Coliseum by a score of 80-59. 

In 2019, Georgia won again in a nailbiter 82-78. The teams did not meet during the 2020–2021 season due to COVID-19 restrictions. In 2021, the series started back up 
again. This time, the Jackets beat Georgia, ending their five year losing streak to the Bulldogs, by winning in Athens 88-78. It was Josh Pastner’s first win against Georgia. 

The following year, the two teams played one of the most memorable games in the rivalry. Georgia led by first year head coach Mike White entered the game 7-2. Tech came into the game 5-3. In a game that featured 11 ties and 18 lead changes, the Jackets scored the last six points of the game to defeat the Bulldogs 79–77 in front of a rowdy home crowd at McCamish Pavilion.

Baseball

April 16, 1898, the first baseball game between Georgia and Georgia Tech, then known as the Georgia School of Technology was played with Georgia winning 18 to 4. The game was played at the newly created ballfields in Piedmont Park located in the center of the horse race track, almost exactly where they still are today. Piedmont Park served the Atlanta Crackers, the city's original professional baseball team, before they moved to a stadium on Ponce de Leon Avenue in 1904.

The two baseball teams have met 350 times since 1898. Georgia Tech has 149 wins, Georgia has 199 wins, and there are 2 ties in the series. Three baseball games are played between the two institutions every year. Two of the three games are played at the respective colleges' baseball stadiums while the finale is played at Truist Park, home of the Atlanta Braves. The 2004 Georgia Tech vs. Georgia Game at Turner Field had the second most spectators in college baseball history with 28,836 fans in attendance.

Between the two schools, Georgia holds the only National Title by besting Oklahoma State in the 1990 College World Series. Both Georgia and Georgia Tech have played in College World Series finals with Georgia competing in two (1990 and 2008) and Georgia Tech competing in three (1994, 2002, and 2006).

Since the reformatting of the NCAA baseball tournament in 1999, Tech and UGA have hosted eight super regionals – the fourthmost super regionals hosted by a state behind California, Texas, and Florida. The two teams have met six times in the NCAA tournament with Georgia holding a 4–2 edge over Tech. Georgia has eliminated Tech three times in tournament play in 1987, 2001, and 2008. Tech avenged the 2001 elimination by eliminating UGA in 2002. Tech and UGA's latest meeting in the 2008 NCAA tournament saw UGA sweep Tech in a two game series, which eliminated Tech from the tournament.

In 2010, Georgia Tech swept the season series against UGA, winning games in Atlanta, at Turner Field, and a 25–6 win in Athens.

Georgia has won the season series the last two seasons taking 2 out of 3 in 2016 and sweeping the Yellow Jackets in 2017.

2017 was the first season the annual neutral site game was played at SunTrust Park (Truist Park's former name), the home of the Atlanta Braves. Both teams traded the lead throughout the game in front of a crowd of 23,737. Georgia completed the season sweep with an 8–7 victory.

Other sports
Georgia Tech and Georgia enjoy healthy rivalries in all other sports in which the two universities compete, most notably softball, women's basketball, and various club sports.

In 2008, the cross country and track teams began a revival of what had once been a common occurrence with short series of events dubbed the "Old School" dual meets. The two teams competed in a total of five one-on-one competitions. The cross country events were hosted by Georgia, and the track events were held at the Georgia Tech Track, site of the 1996 Olympic Trials, in Atlanta. The Georgia men won at all five meetings. The tradition was unceremoniously terminated when the programs mutually agreed to expand the competition in their schedule.

Through August 29, 2008, the two women's volleyball teams have played 31 times, with Georgia leading the overall series with 21 wins over Georgia Tech's 10. However, Tech holds a 10–1 record since 1999, including a 7–1 mark since GT head coach Bond Shymansky took over the program in 2002. The only Georgia victory in this period came in 2005 in front of a record-breaking Georgia Bulldog crowd. Two of the last three meetings (2006 and 2007) were held in Georgia Tech's O'Keefe Gym, both in front of fire-code-limited 2000 spectators, while the latest match (2008) was held at Georgia with a crowd of 1,604.

See also
 List of NCAA college football rivalry games
 List of most-played college football series in NCAA Division I

References

Further reading
 Barnhart, Tony. Southern Fried Football: The History, Passion, And Glory. Triumph Books. 2000. 
 Cromartie, Bill. Clean, Old-Fashioned Hate. Gridiron Publishers. 2002.  
 Dodd, Bobby and Jack Wilkinson. Dodd's Luck. Golden Coast Publishing Company. 1988. 
 Dooley, Vince. Dooley's Dawgs. Longstreet Press. 2003. 
 King, Kim and Jack Wilkinson. Kim King's Tales from the Georgia Tech Sideline. Sports Publishing. 2004. 
 
 Van Brimmer, Adam. Stadium Stories: Georgia Tech Yellow Jackets. Globe Pequot. 2006. .

External links
 Georgia vs Georgia Tech – Georgia – rivalry series record from College Football Data Warehouse

College football rivalries in the United States
Georgia Bulldogs football
Georgia Tech Yellow Jackets football
1893 establishments in Georgia (U.S. state)